Stephen Raymond Wilson, OAM (born 28 December 1971) is an Australian Paralympic athlete.

Personal
Wilson was born in Sydney on 28 December 1971. In 1986, while he was a student at Newington College (1984–1987), Wilson was hit by a truck and doctors were forced to amputate his right leg just below the knee. He is married and has five children. He was a physical education teacher, was the principal of Dalby Christian College and is currently the principal of Livingstone Christian College.

Competitive career

Wilson took up competitive running in 1997; in that year he competed at his first national competition and received the Developing Paralympian of the Year Award. At the 2000 Sydney Paralympics, he won two gold medals in the Men's 4x100 m Relay T46 and Men's 4x400 m Relay T46 events, for which he received a Medal of the Order of Australia. In 2000, his competitive sport participation was sponsored by the Motor Accidents Authority in New South Wales. At the 2004 Athens Paralympics, he won a silver medal in the Men's 4x400 m T42–46 event and a bronze medal in the Men's 4x100 m T42–46 event. At the 2008 Beijing Paralympics, he won a bronze medal in the Men's 4x100 m T42–46 event. He has retired from competitive athletics.

References

External links
 Stephen Wilson at Australian Athletics Historical Results
 

Paralympic athletes of Australia
Athletes (track and field) at the 2000 Summer Paralympics
Athletes (track and field) at the 2004 Summer Paralympics
Athletes (track and field) at the 2008 Summer Paralympics
Medalists at the 2000 Summer Paralympics
Medalists at the 2004 Summer Paralympics
Medalists at the 2008 Summer Paralympics
Paralympic gold medalists for Australia
Paralympic silver medalists for Australia
Paralympic bronze medalists for Australia
Sprinters with limb difference
Australian amputees
Athletes from Sydney
People educated at Newington College
Recipients of the Medal of the Order of Australia
1971 births
Living people
Paralympic medalists in athletics (track and field)
Australian male sprinters
Paralympic sprinters